Terence Chang Chia-Chen is a Hong Kong and American film producer.

Career
Chang is one of John Woo's long time friends and favoured producers. Chang produced the 1997 action hit Face/Off and Mission: Impossible 2.

Following the box-office disappointment of The Crossing, John Woo and Chang disbanded Lion Rock Productions. Following the film, Chang was an executive producer on Zhou Quan's film End Of Summer and Yang Lu's 2014 film Brotherhood of Blades.

Following the disbandment Lion Rock, Chang created the Hong Kong-based Mannix Pictures, a team which included talent agent Amanda Yang Xin in Beijing and Shanghai-based Lucida Entertainment.

Documentaries
Chang is among the actors, producers and directors interviewed in the documentary The Slanted Screen (2006), directed by Jeff Adachi, about the representation of Asian and Asian American men in Hollywood.

Kowloon City
On August 22, 2007, Fruit Chan announced that he will make a film on Bruce Lee's early years, specifically, the Chinese-language movie, Kowloon City. The film will be produced by Chang. The film will be set in 1950s Hong Kong. Chang's credits include Made in Hong Kong, Hollywood Hong Kong and Durian Durian.

Stanley Kwan stated that he was talking with Lee's family to make a movie about the late action movie icon. Further, in April, Chinese state media announced that its national broadcaster started filming a 40-part TV series on Bruce Lee to promote Chinese culture for the 2008 Beijing Summer Olympics.

Partial filmography
As producer
 The Killer (1989)
 Once a Thief (1991)
 Hard Boiled (1992)
 Hard Target (1993)
 Broken Arrow (1996)
 Face/Off (1997)
 Windtalkers (2002)
 Bulletproof Monk (2003)
 Paycheck (2003)
 Blood Brothers (2007)
 Red Cliff (2008)
 The Crossing (2014)

References

External links

 Terence Chang at rottentomatoes.com

American film producers
Living people
University of Oregon alumni
Year of birth missing (living people)